The Last Fashion Show is a 2011 Italian giallo-thriller film directed by Carlo Vanzina. This film was the third in a gialli trilogy, which included Nothing Underneath (1985) and Too Beautiful to Die (1988).

Cast
Francesco Montanari as Inspector Vincenzo Malerba
Vanessa Hessler as Brigitta "Britt" Olsen
Richard E. Grant as Federico Marinoni
Alexandra Burman as Alexandra Larsson
Giselda Volodi as Daria Marinoni
Virginie Marsan as Cris
Paolo Seganti as Beppe Luini
Claudine Wilde as Heidi
Ernesto Mahieux as Giorgio Viganotti
Mario Cordova as Max Liverani
Alexander Doetsch as Bruce
Elena Cotta as Pina
Vincenzo Zampa as Mancuso
Francesco Barilli as the Police Commissioner
Stefano Molinari as Tanino Andò

See also
Nothing Underneath

References

External links

2011 films
Films directed by Carlo Vanzina
Giallo films
2010s Italian-language films
2011 thriller films
Italian thriller films